Texico (62889 - also called Field) is an unincorporated community in Jefferson County, Illinois, United States. The population was 851 at the 2010 census.

Texico was named by Cashus M. Columbus Theodore Claybourn (1860 - 1936), a resident of Texico from his birth until 1901, when he moved to Texas. Cashus derived the name of "Texico" by using Tex for Texas where he had moved, the i for Illinois, the c for Claybourn, and o for Osborns, a family which owned the land on the south side of the main road in the town.

Four churches are located in Texico, the largest and oldest being the Panther Fork Baptist Church. Others include Donoho (a Prairie Christian Church), Antioch Christian Church, and Union Chapel. Texico also has a Post Office, previously had a bank (Texico State Bank) and is home to Field Grade School, a K-8 elementary school.

References

Unincorporated communities in Jefferson County, Illinois
Unincorporated communities in Illinois
Mount Vernon, Illinois micropolitan area